Oleksandr Oleksandrovych Okipniuk (born 4 September 1998) is a Ukrainian freestyle skier, specializing in aerials.

Career
Okipniuk took up freestyle skiing in his hometown Berehove, and his mother was his first trainer.

Okipniuk's debut at international competitions occurred on February 11, 2012, at the European Cup stage in Bukovel, Ukraine, where he was 19th. He made his World Cup debut one year later on February 23, 2013, also in Bukovel. He placed 27th. Between 2013 after his World Cup debut, and 2018, he participated at the World Cup competitions only once, taking part in European Cup events. One of the reasons was his back injury he suffered in 2015. He went to Kisvárda, Hungary, to undergo medical treatment. He resumed his training at the end of 2016.

He has been a permanent member of the Ukrainian national team since the 2018–19 season. As of January 2022, his best World Cup finish was 6th on February 6, 2021, in Deer Valley, United States.

Okipniuk competed at five Junior World Championships. He achieved his best result in 2018 when he finished 12th in Minsk, Belarus.

His World Championships debut was at the 2021 Championships in Almaty, Kazakhstan. He was then 12th in the individual competition.

In 2022, Oleksandr Okipniuk was nominated for his first Winter Games in Beijing.

Personal life
Okipniuk is student of the sports faculty at the Kamyanets-Podilsky Ivan Ohienko National University.

Career results

Winter Olympics

World Championships

World Cup

Individual rankings

European Cup

Individual podiums

References

External links

1998 births
Living people
People from Berehove
Ukrainian male freestyle skiers
Freestyle skiers at the 2022 Winter Olympics
Olympic freestyle skiers of Ukraine
Sportspeople from Zakarpattia Oblast